Francis Shom Kumbur (born 4 April 1979) is a Nigerian former footballer who played at both professional and international levels as a striker.

Career 
Born in Lagos, Kumbur has played in Nigeria, Morocco and England for Plateau United, KAC Marrakech, Yeovil Town, Haywards Heath Town, Gravesend & Northfleet and  Eastbourne Town.

He also earned one cap for Nigeria in 2002.

References 

1979 births
Living people
Association football forwards
Nigerian footballers
Nigeria international footballers
Ebbsfleet United F.C. players
Yeovil Town F.C. players
Haywards Heath Town F.C. players
Eastbourne Town F.C. players
Expatriate footballers in England
Nigerian expatriate footballers
Nigerian expatriate sportspeople in England
English Football League players
Nigerian expatriate sportspeople in Morocco
Expatriate footballers in Morocco
Plateau United F.C. players
Kawkab Marrakech players